Diez de Octubre is one of the 15 municipalities or boroughs (municipios in Spanish) in the city of Havana, Cuba.

Overview
It is one of the oldest municipalities of the capital. Its foundation dates from the second half of the 16th Century aimed at populating the city when the Canary Islanders emigrate to Cuba.

References

External links

Municipalities of Havana